Donat Kurti (1903–1983) was an Albanian Albanian franciscan friar, educator, scholar and folklorist. Donat Kurti was born in Shkodër, back then Ottoman Empire). He studied theology and philosophy at the Collegium Antonianum in Rome and was ordained as a Franciscan priest in 1927. After his return to Shkodra, he taught at the Illyrian college. Kurti was particularly interested in Albanian folklore and epic verse. With Bernardin Palaj, he published the best-known cycles of epic poetry in Kângë kreshnikësh dhe legenda (The Songs of the Frontier Warriors and Legends), Tirana, 1937.

After World War II, as many other Catholic priests, Kurti was arrested by the communists in 1946 and spent the next 17 years in various prisons (in Shkodra, Burrel, Beden, and other internment camps). During this period he translated the New Testament into Albanian. He is also remembered for his two-volume Prralla kombtare mbledhë prej gojës së popullit (National Folk Tales Collected from the Mouth of the People), Shkodra, 1940, 1942.

See also
Catholicism in Albania
Thimi Mitko
Shtjefën Gjeçovi
Albanology

References

20th-century Albanian Roman Catholic priests
Albanian folklorists
People from Shkodër
Latin–Albanian translators
Translators of the Bible into Albanian
20th-century translators
1903 births
1983 deaths